Timnath-heres or Timnath-serah, later Thamna, was the town given by the Israelites to Joshua according to the Hebrew Bible. He requested it and the people gave it to him "at the order of the Lord". He built up the town and lived in it.

According to the Septuagint version of the Book of Joshua, Joshua placed there "the stone knives, with which he had circumcised the children of Israel".

According to the Bible, Joshua was buried there. Jewish tradition also places the tomb of Caleb there.

In 2022, excavations by Israeli archaeologists were launched at Khirbet Tibnah in Samaria, a hilltop site commonly identified as biblical Timnath.

Etymology

In the book of Joshua Chapter 24, verse 30; it is written in thirteen different published editions of the Old Testament as Timnath-Heres or some variation of it where the second word begins with an 'h', or 'H' and ends in 's', either with or without the intermediate dash.

In the Talmud the town is mentioned in Bava Batra 122b, where "heres" is translated as "earthenware," in reference to fruits in the area being as dry as earthenware prior to the arrival of Joshua. The word's inversion, "serah" is defined as "rotting," that after Joshua's arrival, the fruits became so juicy that they could quickly rot.

Location
The town was located in the mountainous region of Ephraim, north of Mount Gaash. It has been variously identified with two possible locations, Kifl Hares and Khirbet Tibnah.

Both E. Schürer and archaeologist W. F. Albright identified Timnath-heres with Thamna, mentioned in Greco-Roman sources including the writings of Josephus. Eusebius, in his Onomasticon, mentions the site under the entry of Gaas (Mount Gaash), a mountain in Ephraim, "near the village of Thamna."

Conder & Kitchener of the Palestine Exploration Fund, steering clear of committing themselves to pinpointing the position of the biblical Timnath-heres in either Kifl Haris or Khirbet Tibnah, mention only the classical references to the place Thamnatha / Thamna (as in Pliny, Hist. Nat. v. 14 and in The Jewish War 3.3.5), saying that this place is to be identified with the present ruin Tibneh (marked on sheet xiv), and that "some have identified it with Timnath-heres."

During the first-century CE until its destruction, Thamna served as an administrative district (toparchy).

Kifl Hares
One possible location Timnath-heres has been identified with is the Palestinian village of Kifl Hares, located 6 kilometres west of Salfit in the West Bank.

Khirbet Tibnah
Another candidate is Khirbet Tibnah, located between Deir Nidham and Nabi Salih, east of the Israeli town of Shoham and near the settlement of Halamish. Various surveys have produced proof of habitation from the Bronze Age until the early Ottoman period, with various findings from the Iron Age and the Hasmonean, Roman, and Mamluk periods.The dig is led by Dvir Raviv, an archeologist who mapped the site in 2015. He made  sketches of the location of tombs, assembled pottery shards and documented burial caves. The current excavation has unearthed a spear tip dated to the second century C.E. as well as pottery and coins.

References

Bibliography

External links
 Survey of Western Palestine, 1880 Map, Map 14: IAA, Wikimedia commons (Tibneh, shown to the left of Neby Saleh and Deir en Nidham)

Hebrew Bible cities
Archaeological sites in Samaria
Archaeological sites in the West Bank
Disputed Biblical places
Joshua